Weeze (Dutch: Wees) is a municipality in the Lower Rhine (Niederrhein) region, in the northwestern part of North Rhine-Westphalia in the district of Kleve in the region of Düsseldorf.

The municipality consists of the town of Weeze and the village of Wemb and has approximately 10,500 inhabitants. It is situated in the district of Kleve, embedded in the northwestern part of the Lower Rhine Region, and lies between Goch to the north and Kevelaer to the south. The Netherlands lie directly to the west.

History

Individual artefacts from the earliest settlement of the area date back to the early/middle Stone Age. In the following periods a burial site with 1,000 tumuli in the area of Kalbeck, settlement remains on the Hees, remnants of the Roman road between Cologne and Nijmegen in the Netherlands and a significant discovery of Roman silver coins have all been found on municipal soil. Franconian burial sites from around the 8th century have also been unearthed in the close vicinity of the town centre.

Examples of Weeze's history are the restored Catholic church of St Cyriakus, excavations from the Stone and Bronze Ages, Wissen Castle complete with moat, Kalbeck Castle and the ruins of Hertefeld Castle.

An area in and around today's Weeze was first-mentioned in a document from King Lothar II in 855 when the King presented Count Ansfried with a piece of estate to the east of the River Niers, known as Villa Geizefurt and situated mainly in the farmstead area of Kalbeck.

The area was populated before the name Weeze was officially mentioned for the first time in a document in 1226 when the Earl to Alpen, Henry III, presented the Zisterzienserkloster Kamp with an estate in the farmstead of Vornick.

The municipal development suffered a major setback during the Second World War when eighty percent of the town was destroyed. Through commitment, hard work and craft skills the citizens of Weeze managed to rebuild the town. Destroyed houses and buildings were rebuilt in the fifties and sixties. The town development was continuously pursued and culminated in the redevelopment of the town centre. Today, the town centre is the forum for activities such as the Kirmes (carnival fair), Christmas markets, street parties and more.

Weeze became well known through its energetic shoe-makers, whose shoes were distributed to Krefeld and Wuppertal, later through carpentry and woodworking, and through the Royal Air Force airbase at Laarbruch, which was located in the heart of the Municipality between 1954 and 1999. Today it is the newly opened regional airport "Airport Weeze", located on the former RAF airbase.

Coat of arms

The Municipality of Weeze was granted the right to carry a coat of arms by the Prussian Ministry of State on April 28, 1928. The official blazon of the coat of arms of Weeze is:

The saint depicted in the left half of the field is the patron saint of the town, St. Cyriacus, with a book and palm. The top right half of the field depicts a black dragon's head on a golden background (in reference to a legend of Cyriacus enchaining a dragon), and the bottom right half with a white background bears a green twig with five red roses (Geldrian roses/medlar blooms, depicting the affiliation to the former duchy of Geldern) and five leaves.

The coat of arms can be seen on the Weeze juror's (court's) crest from 1460.

Economy

The departure of almost 40% of the local population with the withdrawal of British personnel and the closure of nearby RAF Laarbruch in 1999 left Weeze's politicians and inhabitants with a major challenge. Industrial estates have been redesigned and extended so that companies have been able to expand and new companies have, as a result, chosen Weeze as a home base. The population has grown by almost 10% since the departure of RAF personnel and their families. Local politicians are targeting a future population of 12,000.

With the positive economic perspective provided by Weeze Airport, which already employs in the region of 350 locals, the municipality of Weeze is to undergo many changes in its infrastructure. Roads to and from the airport will have to be extended and improved to meet future demand. Schools and kindergartens will also have to grow in capacity for the targeted increase in population.

The municipality can be reached by road and rail: via Autobahn A 57, via the B 9 road or by rail on the Cologne-Kleve link. Due to this fact and the easy accessibility from the Rhine-Ruhr region, from Düsseldorf and Krefeld, as well as from the Netherlands, Weeze is an attractive site for commercial businesses. With recent state approval for the development of the former RAF Laarbruch airbase into a regional civilian airport with a logistical and industrial base, a projected 2,000 jobs were to be created by the year 2010.

Airport 

The airport in the Municipality of Weeze was formerly home to a Royal Air Force base at RAF Laarbruch between 1954 and 1999, situated close to the village of Weeze-Wemb. Closure of the airbase in 1999 had a considerable effect on the local economy, with the loss of 400 jobs and the departure of 5,000 base personnel and dependants.

The airbase was rejuvenated by a new role as a civilian regional airport Weeze Airport (also known as Niederrhein) which saw commercial operations commence in May 2003. Situated near the city of Cleves, the new airport has been intended to enable low-cost airlines to operate efficiently. Approximately 11 million travellers, mostly Dutch and German, use the airport annually. The large-scale glass front, granite floor and a modern interior provide for an up-to-date appearance. Parking spaces for 1,000 vehicles were built in front of the terminal.

On 3 January 2006, an administrative court suspended the airport's operating licence in response to complaints over noise. Flight operations however continue while the issue is debated in the courts.

Politics and government 

The municipal council of Weeze has 28 members. Since the municipal elections in 2014, the membership of the council has been:
 CDU (58.7%, 16 seats);
 SPD (25.1%, 7 seats)
 Alliance '90 / The Greens (10.4%, 3 seats), and;
 FDP (5.8%, 2 seats).

Culture and tourism

The surrounding countryside draws tourists and nature lovers. Its setting on the River Niers in the northern part of the Lower Rhine Region combined with the close proximity to the Netherlands make Weeze an easily accessible town. On its way to the Meuse the Niers snakes past castles and old farmhouses. Natural and historical sights of interest are dotted throughout the municipality, making the countryside setting attractive and interesting.

Wissen Castle
Schloss Wissen is a moated castle located to south of Weeze on the B 9 trunk road. The roots of this complex date back to the 14th century. After a number of different building phases, today's castle is primarily neo Gothic in design. The von Loe family extensively restored the castle between 1969 and 1973.

A highlight of the castle is its neo Gothic chapel which was built in 1876 and designed by the Cologne architect Vincenz Statz. An authentic servants’ settlement, the Boye, also belongs to the castle complex, where extensive buildings stemming from the past two centuries are still visible.

Kalbeck Castle
On the other side of Weeze, to the north, is the complex of Kalbeck, hardly visible from the road and situated in a large wood. This castle also has a long history, being first mentioned as a moated castle in 1326. Destroyed by fire on a number of occasions, Baron Friedrich von Vittinghoff-Schell rebuilt it in 1909 modelled on Westphalian moated castles of the 18th century. The gardens of the castle provide a backdrop for classical outdoor concerts in the summer.

The ruins of Hertefeld Castle

This historically important manor (14th century) and later Baroque castle lies to the east of Weeze in the middle of an approximately five-hectare park and is still owned by the family of zu Eulenburg und Hertefeld. The castle received extensive war damage in 1945 and of its complex only the neighbouring house from 1706 remained intact. However, the ruins of the castle were bolstered so that the remaining historical walls could host classical and theatrical events.

Tourism
The Municipality offers a wide range of outdoor activities. An almost  network of bridle, cycling and rambling paths, partially along the Niers River, as well as recreational activities such as angling, canoeing and kart racing round off an abundance of leisure activities in and around the Municipality.

The Herrensitz-Route, a border-crossing cycling route, guides cyclists to these and many other highlights and attractions of the region, such as Kleve, home of Anne of Cleves; Kevelaer, famous for its pilgrimages, Moyland Castle between Kalkar and Bedburg-Hau, or Gennep in the Netherlands where the Meuse and Niers rivers converge.

The Weeze animal park with its educational trail and children's zoo is a special attraction for families. The park is located on the edge of the town next to the ruins of Hertefeld Castle.

Twin towns
Weeze is twinned with the town of Watton, Norfolk in England.

Facts and figures

Religious makeup: 
72% Roman Catholic,
17% Protestant,
11% other religious denominations or non-religious

Municipal area:
The Municipality encompasses Weeze, Wemb, the area of the former military airfield Laarbruch (now Weeze Airport) and 16 farmsteads.

Land cultivation:
Farming , woodland , rest 

Commercial and employment structure:
67 craftsman's guilds, 14 industrial firms, 161 trading businesses, 2 banks, 27 restaurants and pubs, 154 other businesses (insurance agents etc.)

Protected buildings and natural sites of interest:
 Alte Försterei (old forester's house)
 Alte Kaplanei (old chaplain's house)
 Altenheim Clemenshaus (senior citizen's residence)
 Evgl. Pfarrkirche (Protestant church)
 Kath. Pfarrheim (Catholic vicarage)
 Kath. Pfarrkirche Heilig Kreuz (Catholic church in Wemb)
 Kath. Pfarrkirche St. Cyriakus (Catholic church in Weeze)
 Marienwasserhof (remains of the former monastery Marienwasser)
 Castle ruins and domestic building of Hertefeld Castle
 Schloss Kalbeck (Kalbeck Castle)
 Wasserburg Schloss Wissen (Wissen Castle and moat)
 Wassermühle (watermill)
 Windmühle Wemb (windmill)
 2 Kastanien am Heishof, Kalbeck (2 chestnut trees with a circumference of )
 20 Kopfeichen am Büssenhof, Kalbeck (20 oak trees)
 Kroneiche in Vorselaer (oak tree with a circumference of )
 Trüppeiche am Trüpphoff in Wissen (oak tree with a circumference of )
 Zigeunereiche am evgl. Friedhof (oak tree near Protestant graveyard with a circumference of )

Languages spoken
German, Dutch

Famous residents
 Ronald Pofalla, General-Secretary of the CDU

See also
 List of windmills in North Rhine-Westphalia
 Well, Limburg#Localities

References

External links

 Website for the Municipality of Weeze
 Website for Airport Weeze
 Website for Museum "Royal Air Force Laarbruch - Weeze

Kleve (district)